The Seletiva de Kart Petrobras is a karting competition in Brazil. The competition is promoted by former racing driver Paulo Carcasci, and sanctioned by the Brazilian autosports federation (Confederação Brasileira de Automobilismo).

Rules
Each year, twelve drivers between 15 and 18 years old are selected to compete. Previous winners are excluded. To be selected for the final event, drivers must pass pre-selection. The organization designates rounds of the national and certain regional karting championships as pre-selection races. The karts are provided by the organization, depending on the hosting track. For the 2017 event, they used Bravar karts powered by a 28HP Biland engine.

The winner of the competition receives 85,000, and the second-place finisher receives 8,000. For the 2017 event, an additional prize was added. The winner was selected to compete in the 2017 Mazda Road to Indy Shootout, in this competition Olin Galli was the winner.

Results

Notable other participants
 Jeison Teixeira, 10th in 1999
 Allam Khodair, 6th in 1999
 Tuka Rocha, 7th in 1999, 9th in 1999
 Lico Kaesemodel, 11th in 2000
 Roberto Streit, 2nd in 1999, 12th in 2000
 Ana Beatriz, 4th in 2001, 7th in 2002, 2nd in 2003
 Raphael Matos, 6th in 2001
 Ruben Carrapatoso, 2nd in 2002
 Diego Nunes, 8th in 2002
 Galid Osman, 9th in 2002
 Mario Romancini, 3rd in 2004
 Fabiano Machado, 5th in 2005 Graduados B, 5th in 2006 Graduados A
 Leonardo Cordeiro, 4th in 2005 Graduados B, 9th in 2006 Graduados A
 Clemente de Faria Jr., 4th in 2004, 3rd 2005 Graduados A
 Nestor Girolami, 10th in 2006 Graduados A
 César Ramos, 3rd in 2006 Graduados A, 2nd in 2007
 Pipo Derani, 11th in 2008
 Felipe Nasr, 8th in 2008
 Bruno Bonifacio, 10th in 2009
 Claudio Cantelli, 8th in 2009
 Pietro Fantin, 7th in 2009
 Victor Franzoni, 8th in 2010
 Vitor Baptista, 7th in 2013, 8th in 2014
 Matheus Leist, 2nd in 2013, 3rd in 2014

References

Kart racing
Motorsport competitions in Brazil